Dream Home, formerly Power House is a Philippine television talk show broadcast on GMA News TV and GMA Network. Originally hosted by Mel Tiangco, it premiered on February 28, 2011. The show concluded on April 29, 2016. Kara David served as the final host from 2013 to 2016.

Overview
It was originally hosted by Mel Tiangco from 2011 to 2013. It was released on February 28, 2011, on GMA News TV.

The weekly public affairs program, conceptualized by GMA News and Public Affairs' Senior Program Manager Jaileen Jimeno, also features their quirks, habits and past times to show that even the most powerful people do let their hair down once in a while.

Hosts 
 Mel Tiangco 
 Kara David

Accolades

References

External links
 

2011 Philippine television series debuts
2016 Philippine television series endings
English-language television shows
Filipino-language television shows
GMA Network original programming
GMA Integrated News and Public Affairs shows
GMA News TV original programming
Philippine television talk shows